Island Lake is a reservoir located in the village of Island Lake, Illinois, in the United States. It has several small islands.

References

Reservoirs in Illinois
Lakes of Lake County, Illinois